Sepiolinae is a subfamily of bobtail squid encompassing 5 genera and more than 30 species.

Classification
Subfamily Sepiolinae
Genus Euprymna
Euprymna albatrossae
Euprymna berryi, Double-ear Bobtail
Euprymna brenneri 
Euprymna hoylei
Euprymna hyllebergi
Euprymna morsei, Mimika Bobtail
Euprymna penares *
Euprymna phenax
Euprymna scolopes, Hawaiian Bobtail Squid
Euprymna stenodactyla
Euprymna tasmanica, Southern Dumpling Squid
Genus Inioteuthis
Inioteuthis capensis
Inioteuthis japonica
Inioteuthis maculosa
Genus Rondeletiola
Rondeletiola minor, Lentil Bobtail
Genus Sepietta
Sepietta neglecta, Elegant Bobtail
Sepietta obscura
Sepietta oweniana, Common Bobtail
Sepietta petersi, Mysterious Bobtail
Genus Sepiola
Sepiola affinis, Anagolous Bobtail
Sepiola atlantica, Atlantic Bobtail
Sepiola aurantiaca, Golden Bobtail
Sepiola birostrata, Butterfly Bobtail
Sepiola intermedia, Intermediate Bobtail
Sepiola knudseni
Sepiola ligulata, Tongue Bobtail
Sepiola parva
Sepiola pfefferi *
Sepiola robusta, Robust Bobtail
Sepiola rondeleti, Dwarf Bobtail
Sepiola rossiaeformis *
Sepiola steenstrupiana, Steenstrup's Bobtail
Sepiola trirostrata
Sepiola sp., Southern Bobtail Squid

References

External links
CephBase: Sepiolinae

Bobtail squid